Meghna Mishra is an Indian playback singer, mainly a selected playback singer of music director Amit Trivedi. She delivered 2 superhit tracks, "Nachdi Phira" and "Main Kaun Hoon", in the 2017 film Secret Superstar starring Zaira Wasim, Meher Vij and Aamir Khan. She won Best Female Playback Singer for "Nachdi Phira" at the 63rd Filmfare Awards. The song "Main Kaun Hoon" was picked as one of the best Hindi songs of 2017 by an online portal. The songs were written by Kausar Munir and composed by Amit Trivedi.

Discography

Awards & Nominations

References

Bollywood playback singers
Indian women playback singers
Filmfare Awards winners
Living people
2001 births
21st-century Indian singers
21st-century Indian women singers
Singers from Mumbai
Women musicians from Maharashtra
International Indian Film Academy Awards winners